A gem, or gemstone, is a cut rock or mineral.

Gem or GEM may also refer to:

Arts, entertainment and media

Fictional characters 
 Gem Reeves, in Neighbours
 Gem, in Star Treks "The Empath"
 Gem, in Tron: Legacy
 Gem, in Power Rangers RPM
 Gems, aliens in Steven Universe
 Gems, in Land of the Lustrous

Music 
 GEM (band), a Japanese idol girl group
 Gem (American band), with Doug Gillard 
 Gem (Dutch band), a rock band
 G.E.M. (Gloria Tang Sze-wing, born 1991), a Chinese singer-songwriter
G.E.M. (EP), 2008
 Gem (album), by Beni Arashiro, 2007
 "The Gem", a song by Priestess from the 2009 album Prior to the Fire

Other uses in arts, entertainment and media
 "Gem", a 2006 episode of TV series The Inside
 The Gem, an early 20th-century British story paper
 Gem Theater, Deadwood, South Dakota, U.S., a 19th-century saloon
 Gem Theatre, Detroit, Michigan, U.S. Historic Place
 Gem TV (disambiguation),  the name of several broadcasters

Businesses and organisations
 GEM Motoring Assist, a British road safety and breakdown recovery organisation 
 G. E. M. Membership Department Stores, a chain of discount stores in the U.S. and Canada
 Global Electric Motorcars, an American manufacturer of low-speed vehicles
 GEM, musical instruments by Generalmusic
 Global Earthquake Model, a public–private partnership to develop risk assessment software 
 Gordon–Evernham Motorsports, a NASCAR Busch Series race team 
 Grenoble École de Management, a French graduate business school

People
 Gem Archer (born 1966), English musician
 Harry Gem (1819–1881), English lawyer, soldier, writer and sportsman

Places

United States
 Gem, Kansas
 Gem County, Idaho
 Gem, Indiana
 Gem, Ohio
 Gem, Texas
 Gem, West Virginia
 Gem Glacier, Glacier National Park, Montana
 Gem Valley, Idaho
 Gem Lake (Flathead County, Montana)
 Lake Gem (Florida)

Elsewhere
 Gem, Alberta, Canada
 Gem Lake (Vancouver Island), British Columbia, Canada
 Gem Constituency, Kenya

Science and technology
 GEM (gene), GTP-binding protein 
 Gem, a format of the RubyGems package manager for Ruby
 Gem, codename for the PlayStation Move controller
 Gem, the game engine of Best Way
 GEM of Egypt, a power shovel used for strip mining
 Geminal, in chemistry
 Gemini (constellation), in astronomy
 Gas electron multiplier, a type of gaseous ionization detector
 German equatorial mount, for astronomical telescopes and cameras
 GEM (desktop environment) (Graphics Environment Manager), a software operating environment
 GEM, a compiler backend created for DEC MICA and later used in OpenVMS and Tru64.
 Graphics Environment for Multimedia, graphics software
 Global Environmental Multiscale Model, a meteorological forecasting system 
 Globally Executable MHP, a DVB specification for TV 
 Graphics Execution Manager, video software
 Graphite-Epoxy Motor, a series of solid rocket boosters 
 Gravitoelectromagnetism, formal analogies between the equations for electromagnetism and relativistic gravitation
 Gyrokinetic ElectroMagnetic, a plasma turbulence simulation 
 SECS/GEM, semiconductor's equipment interface protocol for equipment-to-host data communications

Transportation and military
 Gem (automobile), by the Gem Motor Car Company 1917–1919
 Rolls-Royce Gem, a helicopter engine
 Gem 4/4, a Rhaetian Railway locomotive class
 USS Gem (SP-41), a U.S. Navy patrol vessel 1917-1919

Other uses
 Gem (moth), of the family Geometridae
 Billbergia 'Gem', a hybrid cultivar
 Gem, the commonest paper clip design
 Gender Empowerment Measure, an index designed to measure of gender equality
 Generalized Expertise Measure, a psychometric measure of expertise
 Global Entrepreneurship Monitor, a research project into entrepreneurial activity
 Grand Egyptian Museum, or the Giza Museum, a planned museum of artifacts of ancient Egypt
 Growth Enterprise Market, a board of the Stock Exchange of Hong Kong

See also

 Gems (disambiguation)
 Gemstone (disambiguation)
 Jem (disambiguation)